Ilie Șteflea (11 April 1888 – 21 May 1946) was a Romanian General during World War II and Chief of the Romanian General Staff between 20 January 1942 and 23 August 1944.

Early life and career
Ilie Șteflea was born in Săliște (near Sibiu, in Transylvania, at the time part of Austria-Hungary). Economic hardships forced his family to move to the Kingdom of Romania, to the newly acquired province of Northern Dobruja.

Șteflea attended primary school at Medgidia, and secondary schools at Constanța and at the Gheorghe Lazăr High School in Bucharest. He started his studies at the Military School for Infantry Officers in September 1907, graduating first in his class in 1909. He was promoted to the rank of Sublocotenent (second lieutenant) and assigned to the 34th Infantry Regiment, based in Constanța.

Promoted to Lieutenant in 1912, he was sent in October 1915 by Colonel Radu R. Rosetti on an information-gathering mission in Transylvania. Șteflea's cover name as a spy was Alexandru Ștefănescu, and he was supposed to be a teacher. He crossed the border and went to Predeal, ostensibly for health reasons, and then on to the Timiș Valley and Brașov to buy an overcoat, but in reality he was scoping out possible attack routes for a Romanian incursion into Austria-Hungary.

On  he was wounded at Daidâr (now Shumentsi, Tutrakan Municipality) during the Battle of Turtucaia and evacuated to Moldavia.

On 1 April 1917 he was assigned as instructor to the Military School for Infantry Officers in Botoșani, where he taught infantry tactics inspired by the French military doctrine and his war experience. That year he advanced in rank to major. After the war, Șteflea attended the Higher War School, graduating in 1920. After a training period at the General Staff, he returned to teach at the military academy. In 1925 he pursued his training in France, and was promoted to lieutenant colonel, advancing in rank to colonel in 1930 and brigadier general in 1938.

World War II
After the defeat of the Legionnaires' Rebellion in January 1941, he was appointed commander of the 3rd Infantry Division, with which he participated alongside German troops in the Siege of Odessa in the fall of 1941. He was promoted to major general in January 1942 and then to lieutenant general in January 1944. On 20 January 1942 he was appointed Chief of the Romanian General Staff, a position he occupied until the fall of the Ion Antonescu regime on 23 August 1944, as a result of King Michael's Coup. On that date, Șteflea was temporary placed in command of the 4th Army (23–31 August 1944).

In September, he was relieved of command and then arrested on 11 October 1944, because of his close cooperation with Antonescu. Due to ill health, Șteflea was put under house arrest. His doctor recommended treatment for his heart condition at a health spa, but the request was denied by Alexandru Bârlădeanu. He died at home on 21 May 1946. A month after his death, the Bucharest People's Tribunal ordered the closure of Șteflea's file.

The Sibiu County branch of the National Association of Reserve and Retired Military Personnel is now named after him.

Awards and decorations

References

External links

 AsiiRomani.ro, Biography of Ilie Șteflea

1888 births
1946 deaths
People from Săliște
Romanian Austro-Hungarians
Chiefs of the General Staff of Romania
Romanian Land Forces generals
Romanian military personnel of World War I
Romanian military personnel of World War II
Romanian spies
Recipients of the Iron Cross (1939), 1st class
Knights of the Order of the Crown (Romania)
Recipients of the Order of Michael the Brave
Commanders of the Order of the Star of Romania
Carol I National Defence University alumni
Academic staff of Carol I National Defence University
Gheorghe Lazăr National College (Bucharest) alumni